Chen Wen-min (1920 – 11 February 2022) was a Taiwanese film director, screenwriter and producer.

Life and career 
After already having been a small business owner and mother of ten children, Chen and her husband went into the business of theater management. She took up writing and directing films to support the family's theater, "Ta Ming Theater" (大明戲院). Chen's films frequently portrayed family relationships. 

"Second Degree" (the first and second episodes) is the only one that has survived and copied among the films that Chen participated in the creation of.

Chen died in Hawaii on 11 February 2022, at the age of 102.

Filmography

References

External links 
 
 

1920 births
2022 deaths
Taiwanese film directors
Taiwanese film producers
Taiwanese screenwriters
Taiwanese centenarians
Women centenarians